One Foot or one foot may refer to:

 a single Foot (unit)
 Unipedalism, the condition of having only leg or one foot.
 "One Foot", a variation of an ollie (skateboarding) trick
 "One Foot" (Walk the Moon song), by American rock band Walk the Moon from their 2017 album, What If Nothing
 "One Foot", by American band Fun on their 2012 album, Some Nights

See also
 One Foot in the Grave, a British sitcom
 One Foot in Front of the Other (disambiguation)
 Foot (disambiguation)